Heda Margolius Kovály (15 September 1919 – 5 December 2010) was a Czech writer and translator. She survived the Łódź ghetto and Auschwitz where her parents died. She later escaped whilst being marched to Bergen-Belsen to find that no one would take her in. Her husband was made a deputy minister in Czechoslovakia and he was then hanged as a traitor. As the wife of disgraced man she married again and she and her husband were treated badly. They left for the US in 1968 when the country was invaded by the Warsaw Pact countries. She published her biography in 1973. She and her husband did not return to her homeland until 1996.

Early life 
She was born Heda Bloch to Jewish parents in Prague, Czechoslovakia, where she lived until 1941 when her family was rounded up along with first 5,000 of the city's Jewish population and taken to the Lodz Ghetto in central Poland.

Concentration-camp and Margolius-marriage years 
Married to her childhood sweetheart, Rudolf Margolius, she was separated from her parents when the Jews were taken out of the Łódź ghetto on arrival to the Auschwitz concentration camp in 1944. After arriving at Auschwitz, she was chosen to survive—though her parents were immediately gassed—and to work as a laborer in the Christianstadt labour camp.

When the Eastern Front of the war between Germany and the Soviet Union approached the camp, its prisoners were evacuated. With a few other women in the first months of 1945, it was decided while on this journey to Bergen-Belsen, to escape back to Prague. After arriving in the city, Margolius discovered that most of the people who remained in the city during the war were too frightened by the threat of German punishment to aid an escapee from the camps.

When Soviet forces finally freed Prague from Nazi control the Communist Party began to rise. The experiences of her husband at Auschwitz and Dachau concentration camps had led him to become a communist. Having been asked, he took a job with the Communist government of Klement Gottwald as Deputy Minister of Foreign Trade, despite his own and his wife's reservations about the position.

In 1952, her husband was found guilty of conspiracy during the notorious Slánský trial. Rudolf was one of the eleven Jews on the list of fourteen accused. Having been prevented from seeing her husband for eleven months after his arrest, and after he and the other arrested Jews gave false confessions extracted by torture, Heda later learned that he had been hanged and his body cremated and given to security officials for disposal. In a final indignity, a few miles out of Prague, the officials' limousine began to skid on the icy road and his ashes were thrown under the wheels to create traction. Related to 'a people's enemy' her life was made harder—"Heda was thrown out of her job and her apartment, and then additionally persecuted for being unemployed and homeless."

Their son, Ivan Margolius, was raised in impoverished conditions. For as long as the Communist Party remained in power, she was kept from good jobs and socially shunned. She did not tell Ivan the truth about what happened to his father until he was sixteen years old.

The Trial aftermath
Heda protested against the Slánský trial to the Czechoslovak authorities and to the office of the Presidents of the Republic a number of times. In 1966 she smuggled out of Czechoslovakia to Pavel Tigrid in Paris the secret ruling of the Czechoslovak Supreme Court cancelling the trial and its indictments in totality, which Tigrid published as a supplement to his Svědectví magazine in 1967.

Kovály-marriage years 
She remarried in 1955 to Pavel Kovály (1928–2006). Unfortunately, his name was tarnished because of his association with her as the widow of the alleged traitor, her first husband, Rudolf Margolius.

Emigration from Czechoslovakia to the United States 
Finally in 1968, when once again Soviet Union troops invaded Prague after the Prague Spring and occupation seemed inevitable, Margolius Kovály fled Czechoslovakia to the United States.

She worked as a reference assistant librarian in the Harvard Law School Library at Harvard University, in Cambridge, Massachusetts.

Return to Prague 
Margolius Kovály returned to Prague to retire with her second husband in 1996.

Writing 
Her memoir was originally written in Czech and published in Canada under the title Na vlastní kůži by 68 Publishers in Toronto in 1973. An English translation appeared in the same year as the first part of the book The Victors and the Vanquished published by Horizon Press in New York. A British edition of the book excluded the second treatise and was published by Weidenfeld and Nicolson under the title I Do Not Want To Remember in 1973.

In 1986, she re-published her memoir Under A Cruel Star – A Life in Prague 1941–1968 (published in the United Kingdom as Prague Farewell). The memoir is dedicated to her son and it has been widely translated and is available in French and English as an e-book. The memoir is also available in Chinese, Spanish, Italian, Danish, Romanian, German, Dutch, Norwegian, Japanese, Persian.

In 1985 she published a novel called Nevina (Innocence) in Czech by Index, Köln and republished in the Czech Republic in 2013 by Mladá fronta, Praha. The English translation, by Alex Zucker, was published by Soho Press, New York in June 2015. Professor Marci Shore said of the book: "Although it is crime fiction and designed to be fine reading there is a deeper philosophical point which is that there is no innocence ... To participate in the resistance is to take on the guilt of retaliation and to not participate is to take on the guilt of passivity."

Between 1958 and 1989 she translated from German or English into the Czech language over 24 works of well-known authors such as Arnold Zweig, Raymond Chandler, Philip Roth, Saul Bellow, Arnold Bennett, Muriel Spark, William Golding, John Steinbeck, H. G. Wells and many others.

In 2000 Kovály participated in the making of Zuzana Justman's film A Trial in Prague. In 2015 Mladá fronta, Praha, published Hitler, Stalin a já: Ústní historie 20. století by Heda Kovályová and Helena Třeštíková based on the full transcript of the 2001 TV film documentary Hitler, Stalin a já.

Death 
Margolius Kovály died in Prague, age 91, after a long illness. A memorial plaque dedicated to Heda Margolius Kovály together with her first husband Dr Rudolf Margolius is located on the family tomb at New Jewish Cemetery, Izraelská 1, Prague 3, sector no. 21, row no. 13, plot no. 33, directly behind Franz Kafka's grave.

Bibliography 
 Kovály, Heda and Kohák, Erazim (1973). The Victors and the Vanquished. Horizon Press (New York). . (In Czech: Na vlastní kůži. 68 Publishers (Toronto). 1973)
 Margolius, Heda (1973). I Do Not Want To Remember Auschwitz 1941 - Prague 1968. Weidenfeld and Nicolson (London). .
 Nováková, Helena (1985, pseudonym of Heda Margolius Kovály). Nevina. Index (Köln). In Czech.
 Margolius Kovály, Heda (1986). Under A Cruel Star – A Life in Prague 1941–1968. Plunkett Lake Press (Cambridge, Massachusetts). .
 Margolius Kovály, Heda (1997). Prague Farewell. Indigo (London). . (Kindle edition on Amazon.com or Amazon.co.uk also available.)
 Margolius Kovály, Heda (1997). Under A Cruel Star – A Life in Prague 1941–1968. Holmes & Meier (New York). . In Czech: Na vlastní kůži. Academia (Praha). 2003, 2012.
 Margolius Kovály, Heda (2010). Under A Cruel Star – A Life in Prague 1941–1968. Plunkett Lake Press e-book (Kindle edition on Amazon.com or Amazon.co.uk)
 Margolius Kovály, Heda (2012). Under A Cruel Star - A Life in Prague 1941-1968. Granta (London). .
 Kovályová, Heda (2013) Nevina aneb Vražda v Příkré ulici. Mladá fronta (Praha). . In Czech.
 Margolius Kovály, Heda (2015). Innocence; or Murder on Steep Street. Soho Crime (New York). .
 Kovályová, Heda a Třeštíková, Helena (2015). Hitler, Stalin a já: Ústní historie 20. století. Mladá fronta (Praha). . In Czech.
 Heda Margolius Kovály and Helena Třeštíková (2018). Hitler, Stalin and I: An Oral History. DoppelHouse Press (Los Angeles). , .

See also 

 Cultural Amnesia (book)
 Ivan Margolius
 Rudolf Margolius
 Slánský trial
 Erazim Kohák
 Under a Cruel Star (book)
 A Trial in Prague
 Helen Epstein

References

Further reading
 Margolius Kovály, Heda (1986). Under A Cruel Star – A Life in Prague 1941–1968. Plunkett Lake Press (Cambridge, Massachusetts) .
 Margolius Kovály, Heda and Třeštíková, Helena (2018). Hitler, Stalin and I: An Oral History. DoppelHouse Press (Los Angeles). , .
 Levy, Alan. "Ivan Margolius: Son of Conscience". The Prague Post. 27 November 2002.
 Margolius, Ivan (2006): Reflections of Prague: Journeys through the 20th Century, Wiley (London). . In Czech: Praha za zrcadlem: Putování 20. stoletím. Argo (Prague). 2007. .

External links 
 margolius.co.uk, "Ivan Margolius – Heda Margolius Kovály" official website

1919 births
2010 deaths
American people of Czech-Jewish descent
Czechoslovak emigrants to the United States
Czech women writers
Czech translators
Jewish Czech writers
Harvard University librarians
Writers from Prague
Writers from Boston
Łódź Ghetto inmates
Auschwitz concentration camp survivors
Gross-Rosen concentration camp survivors
Jewish women writers
20th-century translators